Danny P. Thompson (born October 28, 1948) is an American race car driver and the son of the late motorsports entrepreneur Mickey Thompson.

He began his career at age 9, winning his first quarter-midget championship one year later. He moved on to motocross and Formula Atlantic cars in his teens, before graduating to sprint cars and stadium trucks later in life. He took control of the Mickey Thompson Entertainment Group after the murders of his step-mother and father. He left the industry in 1996 following the company's bankruptcy.

In 2003 Thompson succeeded in joining his father in the Bonneville 200 MPH Club. He became the driver of the world's fastest production Ford Mustang in 2008, and in 2016 used a restored and updated version of Mickey's 1968 prototype streamliner the Challenger 2 to capture the SCTA unblown fuel streamliner record with an average speed of 406.7 mph.

Thompson is responsible for the restoration and exhibition of many historically significant racing vehicles.

On August 12, 2018 he broke the overall piston-driven land speed record with a speed of 448.75 mph, also in Challenger 2.

References

1948 births
Living people
American racing drivers
Bonneville 300 MPH Club members
Atlantic Championship drivers